Leiner is a surname. Notable people with the surname include:

 Benjamin Leiner, American boxer
 Božidar Leiner (1919–1942), Croatian Jewish resistance fighter
 Danny Leiner, American film director
 Gershon Henoch Leiner, Polish Jewish theologian
 Laura Leiner, Hungarian writer
 Mordechai Yosef Leiner, Polish Jewish theologian
 Shmuel Shlomo Leiner, Polish Jewish theologian
 Simcha Leiner, American Orthodox Jewish singer

See also
 Leiner Health Products, American pharmaceutical company

German-language surnames